Zeliş Şenol aka Zelish (born March 25, 1974) is a Turkish Cypriot singer who was born in Nicosia. She has been involved with music from a young age and has taken part in a number of festivals and toured all the major cities of Cyprus. She has also worked with Grammy winner, Billy Paul and sung in a concert with Billy Cobham. In 2007, she sang in the Europalia Festival in Berlin. She is a member of ‘Larkos Larkos’s’ music group ‘Kyprogenia’ and she performed during Cyprus’ induction ceremony into the European Union. She also studied to become an Actress between 2005-2009, now she is performing in Turkish Municipality  Theatre.

References

Turkish Cypriot singers
Cypriot singer-songwriters
1985 births
21st-century Cypriot women singers
People from Nicosia
Vocal coaches
Living people